Proeulia chrysopteris is a species of moth of the family Tortricidae. It is found in Chile (Valparaíso Region, Santiago Province, Guayacán Province, Concepción Province and Araucania Region).

The length of the forewings is 10–13 mm. Adults are rather variable, with ochreous, golden ochreous, testaceous, or hessian brown forewings with a more or less intensive, ferruginous-ochreous reticulation and/or incomplete, oblique rows of blackish or greyish dots in the apical wing portion. The hindwings are whitish yellow to ochreous.

References

Moths described in 1883
Proeulia
Endemic fauna of Chile